Dark Road is a 1946 mystery thriller novel by the American writer Doris Miles Disney.

Adaptation
In 1950 the film Fugitive Lady was based on the novel, starring Janis Paige and Binnie Barnes.

References

Bibliography
 Goble, Alan. The Complete Index to Literary Sources in Film. Walter de Gruyter, 1999.

1946 American novels
Novels by Doris Miles Disney
American mystery novels
American novels adapted into films
Doubleday (publisher) books